Avicennia bicolor is a species of tropical mangrove in the family Acanthaceae. It grows in coastal and estuarine locations in the Tropical Eastern Pacific, from southern Mexico (Chiapas) along the Pacific coast of Central America to western Colombia.

References

bicolor
Mangroves
Tropical Eastern Pacific flora
Flora of Central America